Daniel Miller is the co-executive producer of Fresh Air, an interview-format radio program produced by WHYY-FM in Philadelphia and distributed throughout the United States by National Public Radio. He began working on the program in 1978, becoming the senior producer in 1987.

External links
About Fresh Air 

Year of birth missing (living people)
American radio producers
Living people
Place of birth missing (living people)